Ron Evans (20 February 1926 – 29 December 2004) was  a former Australian rules footballer who played with Richmond and Hawthorn in the Victorian Football League (VFL).

Notes

External links 		
		
		
		
		
		

1926 births
2004 deaths
Australian rules footballers from Victoria (Australia)		
Richmond Football Club players		
Hawthorn Football Club players